KAGR-LP (92.1 FM) is a radio station licensed to serve the community of Arapahoe, Nebraska. The station is owned by The Evangelical Lutheran Trinity Cong. of Arapahoe, NE. It airs a religious format.

The station was assigned the KAGR-LP call letters by the Federal Communications Commission on February 13, 2014.

References

External links
 Official Website
 

AGR-LP
AGR-LP
Radio stations established in 2015
2015 establishments in Nebraska
Furnas County, Nebraska